Nick Zala (born 21 January 1959), is an English pedal steel and guitar player from Barnet, Hertfordshire, England.

Early life
Born Nicholas Michael Anthony Zala, he was exposed to music from a very young age. His grandparents were both skilled pianists - one a sight reader, and the other a jazz musician who played entirely by ear. He took up the cello at the age of seven but gave it up only two years later in favour of the more portable guitar. By the age of 15, he had received jazz guitar tuition from Ike Isaacs and some useful advice in a one-to-one with Joe Pass.

Career
After 30 years as a professional guitar-player and teacher, Zala took up the pedal steel guitar. His first band, The Loose Salute, contacted him eight weeks after he had bought his pedal steel. A positive review of his first gig with The Loose Salute appeared in The Guardian, boosting his career.  Between 2003 and 2007, he recorded on eleven albums, toured in Europe and the United States, appeared on television and radio, and made it into the top ten of the UK Albums Chart, with pop band McFly's platinum-selling album Motion In The Ocean.

Numerous albums have subsequently followed, both in the retail and production music areas, and likewise many sessions, both on guitar, pedal steel and other instruments, including banjo, mandolin, ukulele and harmonica.

His latest title Jazz Guitar described by him as "a homage to Ike (Isaacs), and Joe (Pass), and a fresh look at the genre".

In 2012, Zala played guitar and pedal steel in "Acetones" with Alan Darby (guitar), Jim Watson (keyboards), and Jonathan Noyce (bass).

Zala has been working with composer Chris Bangs  on the feature film, Highly Functional set for U.S. release in September 2016 (pedal steel, guitar, mandolin).

Discography
 2003 - Seafood - As The Cry Flows
 2004 - The General Store - Mountain Rescue
 2004 - Frankie Miller - Long Way Home 
 2005 - The Loose Salute - Suck It Up Buttercup
 2006 - Mojave Three - Puzzles Like You
 2006 - McFly - Motion In The Ocean
 2006 - Songs From The Blue House - Tree 
 2007 - Jessica Blake - Three Good Reason
 2007 - Matt Willis - Crash
 2007 - The Loose Salute - Tuned To Love
 2007 - Virginia Younger - Fall In Love Again
 2010 - Bottleneck Banjo (Library/Production)
 2010 - Light Country Ballads (Library/Production)    
 2010 - Light Country Ballads Volume 2 (Library/Production)
 2010 - Pedal Steel Themes and Beds (Library/Production)      
 2010 - Pedal Steel Themes and Beds Volume 2 (Library/Production)   
 2011 - Classical Guitar Concertos
 2011 - Classical Guitar Concertos Volume 2
 2011 - Pedal Steel Heaven
 2011 - Pedal Steel Heaven Volume 2
 2011 - The Ultimate Folk Collection
 2011 - The Ultimate Folk Collection Volume 2
 2011 - The Ultimate Folk Collection Volume 3
 2011 - The Ultimate Folk Collection Volume 4
 2011 - Classical Guitar Masterpieces
 2011 - Classical Guitar Masterpieces Volume 2
 2011 - The Platinum Country Collection
 2011 - The Platinum Country Collection Volume 2
 2011 - The Platinum Country Collection Volume 3
 2011 - The Platinum Country Collection Volume 4
 2011 - American Anthems
 2011 - American Anthems Volume 2
 2011 - Ultimate Love Songs Collection
 2011 - Ultimate Love Songs Collection Volume 2
 2011 - The Hank Williams Songbook
 2011 - Bluegrass Greats
 2011 - Music Of Love
 2011 - Music Of Love Volume 2
 2011 - Music Of Love Volume 3
 2011 - Strictly Swing
 2011 - Strictly Ballroom Swing
 2012 - Absolute Guitar
 2012 - Romantic Guitar Collection
 2012 - Romantic Guitar Collection Volume 2      
 2012 - Country Classics
 2012 - Light Jazz Guitar Themes and Beds (Library/Production)
 2012 - Light Jazz Guitar Themes and Beds Volume 2 (Library/Production)
 2012 - Absolute Love 
 2012 - 40 Folk Classics 
 2012 - Songs From The Blue House - IV
 2012 - Songs From the Blue House - You’re So Vain
 2013 - Peter Sanford - Help For Heroes
 2013 - Jazz Guitar

References

1959 births
Living people
English rock guitarists
English pop guitarists
English jazz guitarists
English male guitarists
English multi-instrumentalists
People from Chipping Barnet
Pedal steel guitarists
Musicians from Hertfordshire